Glen Campbell in Concert with the South Dakota Symphony is the fifty-eighth album by American singer/guitarist Glen Campbell, released in 2001 (see 2001 in music). Recorded for the PBS special "Glen Campbell – In Concert", the concert registration was released on video, CD and DVD.

Track listing
 "Wichita Lineman" (Jimmy Webb) – 3:50
 "Gentle on My Mind" (John Hartford) – 2:46
 "Dreams of the Everyday Housewife" (Chris Gantry) – 2:27
 "Highwayman" (Jimmy Webb) – 3:01
 "By The Time I Get To Phoenix" (Jimmy Webb) – 3:06
 "Classical Gas" (Mason Williams) – 3:04
 "It's Only Make Believe" (Conway Twitty, Jack Nance) – 2:29
 "Little Green Apples" (Robert L. Russell) – 3:28 (duet with Debby Campbell)
 "Southern Nights" (Allen Toussaint) – 3:01
 "Rhinestone Cowboy" (Larry Weiss) – 3:05
 "Galveston" (Jimmy Webb) – 4:00
 "Since I Fell for You" (Woodrow Johnson) – 2:52
 "The Moon Is a Harsh Mistress" (Jimmy Webb) – 3:03
 "William Tell Overture" (Gioachino Rossini, arr. by Glen Campbell, Dennis McCarthy) – 2:49
 "True Grit" (Don Black, Elmer Bernstein) – 2:58
 "Still Within the Sound of My Voice" (Jimmy Webb) – 4:00
 "Amazing Grace" (John Newton) – 3:13
 "Try a Little Kindness" (Bobby Austin, Thomas Sapaugh) – 4:57
 "Don't Pull Your Love/Then You Can Tell Me Goodbye" (Lambert, Brian Potter) – 3:18
 "Time in a Bottle" (Jim Croce) – 2:28
 "Let It Be Me" (Gilbert Bécaud, Manny Kurtz, Pierce Leroyer) – 2:16 (duet with Debby Campbell)
 "MacArthur Park" (Jimmy Webb) – 7:34

Personnel
Glen Campbell – vocals, acoustic guitar, electric guitar
Debby Campbell – vocals
Gary Bruzesse – vocals, drums
Jeff Dayton – vocals, acoustic guitar, electric guitar
Noel Kirkland – vocals, fiddle, banjo, acoustic guitar, keyboards
T.J. Kuenster – musical director, vocals, keyboards
Kenny Skaggs – vocals, acoustic guitar, steel guitar, dobro, mandolin
Russ Skaggs – vocals, bass guitar
The South Dakota Symphony

Production
Executive producer – Glen Campbell, Martin Fischer
Producer – Tom David, T.J. Kuenster
Music director/conductor – T.J. Kuenster
Recorder- Tom David, Greg Lankford
Mixed by Steve Johnson, Tom Davis
Editor - Andreas C.Kouris
Remote facilities provided by TNN
Productions in Nashville, TN
Recorded for the PBS special "Glen Campbell – In Concert" by High Five Television

2001 live albums
2001 video albums
Live video albums
Glen Campbell live albums
Glen Campbell video albums